The 2014 World Junior Championships in Athletics was an international athletics competition for athletes qualifying as juniors (born 1995 or later) which was held at the Hayward Field in Eugene, Oregon, USA, on 22–27 July 2014. A total of 44 athletics events were contested at the championships, 22 by male and 22 by female athletes. A total of 1546 athletes from 175 countries were participate.

Several medalists from the 2012 championships were eligible to defend their titles, including Wilhem Belocian, Ashraf Amgad Elseify, Falk Wendrich, Jessica Judd, Ana Peleteiro and Sofi Flinck.

Men's results

Track

Field

Women's results

Track

Field

Medal table

Participation
According to an unofficial count, 1411 athletes from 153 countries participated in the event.

References

External links 
 Official results

 
World Athletics U20 Championships
World Junior Championships
World Junior Championships In Athletics
Sports in Eugene, Oregon
International track and field competitions hosted by the United States
World Junior Championships In Athletics
World Junior Championships In Athletics
Sports competitions in Oregon
Track and field in Oregon